Niaz Ahmad Akhtar (born 15 June 1962) is a Pakistani academic who is currently serving as the vice-chancellor of Quaid-i-Azam University, in office since 10 March 2023. He is also the vice-chairman of the Pakistan Engineering Council from Punjab.

His other roles have included being the professor emeritus at the University of the Punjab, where he also served as a vice-chancellor, the vice-chancellor of the University of Sahiwal, rector of the National Textile University, Faisalabad, vice-chancellor of the University of Engineering and Technology, Taxila, and the vice-chancellor of the Information Technology University, Lahore. 

He is also the founding director of the Institute of Quality and Technology Management and the Quality Enhancement Cell at the University of the Punjab, Lahore.

In recognition of his outstanding performance in the field of Education (Engineering & Technology), he was awarded Sitara-i-Imtiaz by the Government of Pakistan in 2015.

Early life and education

Akhtar was born on 15 June 1962 in Basti Dosa, Dera Ghazi Khan. He has an undergraduate and a master's degree in chemical engineering from the University of the Punjab, Lahore. He did his doctorate in chemical engineering from the University of Leeds, UK in 1995.

Career

Early career at the University of the Punjab 
Akhtar began his teaching career at the University of the Punjab as a lecturer in chemical engineering in 1988. In 1995, he went to Bahrain and became the senior lecturer and head of chemical engineering discipline at the Bahrain Training Institute. He came back to serve his country in 2001 and joined as an associate professor at the Institute of Chemical Engineering & Technology, University of the Punjab. In 2004, he became a professor at the University of the Punjab, Lahore and served in this capacity until 2009. In 2002, Akhtar established Quality Management Division under the Institute of Chemical Engineering & Technology.

This Division was upgraded to Institute of Quality & Technology Management in 2004 and Akhtar was appointed as the founding director of this institute. The institute is presently offering BS, MS, & PhD degree in field of Industrial Engineering & Quality Management. Akhtar has also served as Founder Director of the Quality Enhancement Cell (QEC) and the Director Student Affairs at the University of the Punjab.

For the first time in Pakistan, he launched MSc, MS and PhD programs in the field of Total Quality Management.

Vice-chancellor at the University of the Punjab 
Akhtar served as the Vice-Chancellor of the University of the Punjab from 2018-2022. Under his leadership the university witnessed the most progressive years in its history. The most notable improvement was the continuous advancement in the international ranking of the university. Despite being one of the oldest and the largest university of the country, the University of the Punjab appeared in the international ranking for the first time in 2018 under the leadership of Akhtar. From amongst the top 78% universities of the world in 2018, the university improved by ~5% per year, reaching the top 57% universities of the world in 2022.

Akhtar made efforts to restructure the academic organization of the university. The initial 13 faculties and 83 teaching departments were modified to 19 Faculties and 146 departments, centers, institutes, colleges and schools.

Under the leadership of Akhtar, the university launched new program/courses at the bachelors, masters and PhD level. The courses like neuroscience, optics & photonics, social policy and social entrepreneurship were offered for the first time in Pakistan. Akhtar also significantly increased the research funding of the university to reform the research output.

Akhtar also took several other steps for the development of the university, including implementation of online teaching and research during the COVID-19 pandemic. University of the Punjab was the first national university to make such a transition to minimize the academic interruption for students.

Rector at the National Textile University 
As the Rector of National Textile University, he created four new faculties and ten new departments, growing the number of students by three times, faculty strength by four times and revenue of the university by five times. He launched new programs in Textile Engineering including Ph.D. program in Textile Engineering, Textile Design, Fashion Design and Polymer Engineering. He also established National Textile Research Centre. Furthermore, he revived Plastic Technology Centre and Synthetic Fibre Development Centre, Karachi as the Constituted Units of the National Textile University. Due to his outstanding contribution, he was awarded with the gold medal by BOG of the National Textile University.

Vice-chancellor at the University of Engineering and Technology (UET), Taxila 
In 2014, he became the Vice Chancellor of the University of Engineering & Technology, Taxila. In addition to increasing the number of students and faculty, he started many new programs including 12 new BS, MS and Ph.D. programs. He established new centers including Technology Incubation Center, Staff Development Center, E-Rozgaar Center and Social Entrepreneurship Center. He established Departments of Computer Sciences, Electronics Engineering, Environmental Engineering, Industrial Engineering and Basic Sciences in a state-of-art new Academic Block. He was also instrumental in getting approved of the University Statues in 2017. Owing to his significant contributions, he was decorated with the National Award of Sitara-e-Imtiaz in 2015, in the Field of Education (Engineering & Technology). Akhtar has helped start new programs at Information Technology University.

Vice-chancellor at the University of Sahiwal 
In 2021, Dr. Akhtar was assigned the additional charge of the University of Sahiwal (UoS) for a period of three months or until a regular appointment was made. He established new faculties at the university and modified various existing ones. He also established the online admission portal for the first time in the history of the university. He took steps to promote research culture at the university, developed national and international linkages, and improved the transport facilities at the university.

Vice-chancellor at Quaid-i-Azam University 
Akhtar was appointed vice-chancellor of Quaid-i-Azam University for a period of four years on 10 March 2023. He assumed his role on 14 March 2023.

Vice-chairman of the Pakistan Engineering Council (PEC) 
Akhtar served as Vice-Chairman (Punjab) of the Pakistan Engineering Council (PEC) for over 6 years. Through his work for the accreditation of engineering programs, Pakistan became a signatory of the Washington Accord, earning international recognition for Pakistani engineers.

Research
Akhtar has published/edited four books on "Quality Assurance in Higher Education". He has published research articles in high impact journals. He served as the Chief Editor of the Journal of Quality & Innovation (2005-2017) and Member Advisory Board, Journal of Quality Assurance in Education (Emerald Journal).

Awards 

 Institution of Engineers Pakistan, National Award of Excellence - (2008, 2009 & 2015)
 Best Research Paper, Award by HEC - (2012)
 Sitara-i-Imtiaz, Government of Pakistan - (2015)
 Outstanding Performance Award of Gold Medal from the of BOG of National Textile University - (2015) 
 Pakistan Institute of Chemical Engineers, Gold Medal - (2016)
 Pakistan Engineering Council, Gold Medal - (2017)

Books published/edited 
 Quality Assurance in Higher Education, A Global Perspective edited by Dr. Abdul Raouf and Dr. Niaz Ahmad published by Higher Education Commission, 2008.
 Quality in Higher Education: Challenges and Practices Prof. Dr. Abdul Raouf, Prof. Dr. Riaz Hussain Qureshi and Prof. Dr. Niaz Ahmad published by Punjab University, 2009.
 Higher Education Quality "Assurance and Assessment" edited by Dr. Abdul Raouf, Dr. Niaz Ahmad and Dr. Usman Awan published by Punjab University, 2011.
 Emissions from Circulating Fluidized Bed by Lambert Academic Publishing, Germany,  K. Shahzad, N.A. Akhtar

External links 
 Prof. Dr. Niaz Ahmad Akhtar Web Page

References 

University of the Punjab people
University of the Punjab alumni
Alumni of the University of Leeds
1962 births
Living people
Recipients of Sitara-i-Imtiaz